Anse Boileau is an administrative district on the south of the island of Mahé in the Seychelles. Anse Boileau encapsulates the natural wonders of the Seychelles: it sits at the foot of a steep, green mountain, it is on the shores of the Indian Ocean, and in its midst are streams, mini-forests, creeks, ponds, and an enchanting array of all that defines the Seychellois landscape. It is often described as a fishing village because many of the local residents fish for a living. It has a school, a restaurant, a number of grocery shops, a health centre, and a police station. It is a short distance away from Anse La Mouche, a popular tourist destination. Anse Boileau is so-called because of its many coves.

References

External links
 Anse Boileau review of the beach

Districts of Seychelles
Mahé, Seychelles